Seychelles competed at the 2022 Commonwealth Games in Birmingham, England between 28 July and 8 August 2022. It was the ninth time that Seychelles competes at the Games.

Boxer Keddy Agnes and athlete Natasha Chetty were the country's flagbearers during the opening ceremony.

Competitors
The following is the list of number of competitors participating at the Games per sport/discipline.

Athletics

Men
Track and road events

Women
Field events

Boxing

Men

Cycling

Road
Men

Track
Scratch race

Judo

A squad of two judoka was entered as of 7 July 2022.

Men

Squash

Swimming

Men

Women

Mixed

Table tennis

Four players were selected. Godfrey Sultan qualified via the ITTF World Singles Rankings, whereas the other three players received Bipartite Invitations.

Singles

Doubles

Weightlifting

Two weightlifters were selected. Clementina Agricole qualified via the IWF Commonwealth Ranking List, whereas Romentha Larue was awarded a Bipartite Invitation.

References

External links
Birmingham 2022 Commonwealth Games Official site

Nations at the 2022 Commonwealth Games
Seychelles at the Commonwealth Games
2022 in Seychelles